Rockfield is an unincorporated community in Rock Creek Township, Carroll County, Indiana. It is part of the Lafayette, Indiana Metropolitan Statistical Area.

History
Rockfield was platted in 1856. The Rockfield post office was established in 1857. 
District School No. 3 was listed on the National Register of Historic Places in 1988.

Geography
A portion of old Indiana State Road 25 and the Norfolk Southern Railway both pass northeast through town. New Indiana State Road 25, the Hoosier Heartland Highway, bypasses town on the northwest.

Demographics

References

Unincorporated communities in Carroll County, Indiana
Lafayette metropolitan area, Indiana
Unincorporated communities in Indiana
1856 establishments in Indiana
Populated places established in 1856